was a stadium in Hiroshima, Japan.  It was primarily used for baseball, and was the home field of the Hiroshima Toyo Carp.  It opened in 1957 and held 31,984 people.
It stood in the central area of Hiroshima across from the Hiroshima Peace Memorial.

To replace the stadium, the new municipal stadium was completed in March 2009.  The first stadium was renamed  on April 1, 2009, and used for amateur baseball.  The first municipal stadium was closed on September 1, 2010.

The stadium disuse bylaw was concluded by the Hiroshima municipal assembly in June 2010 and the stadium was slated for demolition. In October of the same year, stadium memorabilia was auctioned off and demolition started on November 29. It was completed on February 28, 2012, leaving only a portion of the right field stands (35m x 6m) to be preserved for future generations.

Access
Hiroshima Bus Center
Hiroden Main Line and Ujina Line
Astram Line

External links

Sports venues in Hiroshima
Defunct baseball venues in Japan
Hiroshima Toyo Carp
1957 establishments in Japan
Sports venues completed in 1957
2010 disestablishments in Japan